Léo Michel Joseph Claude Dubois (born 14 September 1994) is a French professional footballer who plays as a right-back for Süper Lig club Galatasaray and the France national team.

Early life 
Dubois' father Jean-Pierre was born in Lebanon, and was adopted at 13-months old by a French family.

Club career

Early career 
As a youth, Dubois trained with amateur sides SC Gemmois and ES Segré.

Nantes 
Dubois eventually made the books of top division club FC Nantes and made his league debut on 9 May 2015 against Bordeaux in a 2–1 away defeat; replacing Kian Hansen after 83 minutes.

Lyon 
Dubois joined fellow Ligue 1 club Lyon on 1 July 2018. Dubois signed a four-year contract with the club. On 27 September 2020, Dubois scored only his fifth ever Ligue 1 goal, in over 140 appearances, in a 1–1 draw with Lorient at the Stade du Moustoir. Dubois was named club captain by manager Peter Bosz in 2021 following the sale of Memphis Depay to Barcelona.

Galatasaray 
On 21 July 2022, Dubois signed with Süper Lig club Galatasaray for a reported €3M.

International career
Dubois was called up to the France senior team for the first time in May 2019. He made his debut on 2 June 2019 in a 2–0 friendly win against Bolivia, coming on for Benjamin Pavard in the 46th minute of the game. 9 days later, Dubois made his first start for the France senior team and played every minute of the match, in the UEFA Euro 2020 qualifying 4–0 away win over Andorra.

On 10 October 2021, Dubois came on as a substitute in the 79th minute of the UEFA Nations League Final, a match France would go on to win 2–1 over Spain.

Career statistics

Club

International

Honours 
Nantes II
 Championnat de France Amateur 2: 2012–13

Lyon
 Coupe de la Ligue runner-up: 2019–20

France
 UEFA Nations League: 2020–21

References

External links

 
 
 
 
 

1994 births
Living people
Sportspeople from Maine-et-Loire
French footballers
France international footballers
France under-21 international footballers
French people of Lebanese descent
Sportspeople of Lebanese descent
Association football defenders
FC Nantes players
Olympique Lyonnais players
Galatasaray S.K. footballers
Ligue 1 players
Süper Lig players
UEFA Euro 2020 players
UEFA Nations League-winning players
Footballers from Pays de la Loire
French expatriate footballers
French expatriate sportspeople in Turkey
Expatriate footballers in Turkey